The 1929 Melbourne Cup was a two-mile handicap horse race which took place on Tuesday, 5 November 1929.

This race saw a 14-horse field compete. This year's Melbourne Cup was best remembered for Phar Lap who had won the Australian Derby and Victoria Derby carrying 47 kg. The three-year-old refused to settle under Bobby Lewis and only ran third behind fellow Night Raid-sired horse, Nightmarch, which also won the Epsom Handicap. Nightmarch became the first horse to win the Cup and the W. S. Cox Plate in the same year.

This is the list of placegetters for the 1929 Melbourne Cup.

See also

 Melbourne Cup
 List of Melbourne Cup winners
 Victoria Racing Club

References

External links
1929 Melbourne Cup Field footyjumpers.com

1929
Melbourne Cup
Melbourne Cup
20th century in Melbourne
1920s in Melbourne